Brandon Charles Leibrandt (born December 13, 1992) is an American professional baseball pitcher who is a free agent. He has played in Major League Baseball (MLB) for the Miami Marlins. Leibrandt is the son of former MLB pitcher Charlie Leibrandt.

Career

Amateur career
Leibrandt attended Marist School in Brookhaven, Georgia. As a pitcher on the school's baseball team, he had a 13–0 win–loss record with an 0.71 earned run average (ERA) in 79 innings pitched with 120 strikeouts and 11 walks as a senior. Leibrandt was named Baseball America High School third team All-American in 2011 and ESPN Rise first team.

Leibrandt enrolled at FSU to play college baseball for the Florida State Seminoles. As a freshman in 2012, he was 8–3 with a 2.82 ERA in 19 starts (tied for third-most in the country), and as a sophomore he finished with a 10–4 record and a 3.44 ERA. In 2013, Leibrandt played collegiate summer baseball with the Brewster Whitecaps of the Cape Cod Baseball League. As a junior he was 4–1 with a 1.83 ERA, before he was injured and had his season cut short. The Philadelphia Phillies selected Leibrandt in the sixth round of the 2014 MLB Draft.

Philadelphia Phillies
Leibrandt signed and spent 2014 with the GCL Phillies and Williamsport Crosscutters, pitching to a combined 3–5 record and 2.82 ERA with 67 strikeouts and an 0.97 WHIP in 60.2 innings. In 2015, he played for the Clearwater Threshers where he compiled a 7–3 record, 3.11 ERA and 1.03 WHIP in 17 starts. He was a Florida State League Mid-Season All Star, and an MiLB Phillies Organization All Star. In 2016, he returned to Clearwater, but pitched in only six games due to injury. He spent 2017 with both the Reading Fightin Phils and Lehigh Valley IronPigs, posting a combined 11–5 record and 3.62 ERA in 25 total starts between the two clubs.

Leibrandt returned to Lehigh Valley in 2018, going 4–1 with a 1.42 ERA and an 0.87 WHIP in 20 games (six starts), and struck out 32 batters in 50.2 innings. He last pitched on June 30, and underwent Tommy John surgery, missing the remainder of the 2018 season and the 2019 season.

The Phillies released Leibrandt on May 29, 2020.

Somerset Patriots
On June 3, 2020, Leibrandt signed with the Somerset Patriots of the Atlantic League of Professional Baseball.

Miami Marlins
On August 10, 2020, the Miami Marlins selected Leibrandt's contract from Somerset. Leibrandt was promoted to the major leagues on August 18. He made his major league debut on August 23 against the Washington Nationals. On the season, Leibrandt appeared in five big league games, notching a 2.00 ERA with three strikeouts in 9.0 innings pitched. He was sent outright to Triple-A on October 29, 2020 and became a free agent on November 2. 

On April 5, 2021, Leibrandt re-signed with the Marlins on a minor league contract. Leibrandt split the season between the Triple-A Jacksonville Jumbo Shrimp and the Double-A Pensacola Blue Wahoos, posting a cumulative 5.68 ERA with 74 strikeouts in 88.2 innings of work across 21 games. He elected free agency following the season on November 7, 2021.

Wild Health Genomes
On February 28, 2022, Leibrandt signed with the Wild Health Genomes of the Atlantic League of Professional Baseball. However, he was released by the team on March 7 prior to the ALPB season.

Chicago Cubs
On March 16, 2022, Leibrandt signed a minor league contract with the Chicago Cubs. He was released on August 5, 2022.

See also
List of second-generation Major League Baseball players

References

External links

Living people
1992 births
People from Alpharetta, Georgia
Baseball players from Georgia (U.S. state)
Major League Baseball pitchers
Miami Marlins players
Florida State Seminoles baseball players
Brewster Whitecaps players
Florida Complex League Phillies players
Williamsport Crosscutters players
Clearwater Threshers players
Reading Fightin Phils players
Lehigh Valley IronPigs players
Pensacola Blue Wahoos players
Jacksonville Jumbo Shrimp players